Sweat Your Cheeses, But Not in My Salad is the third album by Vas Deferens Organization, released on November 4, 1997, through Charnel Music. Inspired by Nurse with Wound's debut album, the band included a list of five-hundred and ninety-seven bands that they deemed important on the inside of the CD's booklet.

Track listing

Personnel 
Vas Deferens Organization
Brian Artwick – instruments
Matt Castille – instruments, production, engineering
Eric Lumbleau – instruments, production, cover art
Production and additional personnel
Robert Cortinas – drums, vocals on "Boarding Instructions for Bird Carousels"
Omar Guerra – drums
Robin Kennon – drums
Jeff Ross – drums
Sharon Valverde – keyboards on "Whirling Dervish"

References 

1997 albums
Charnel Music albums
Vas Deferens Organization albums